Sigrún Stefánsdóttir (born 1944) was the head of radio and television of RÚV, the National Icelandic Broadcasting Service. She is a former university teacher and news reporter.

References

1947 births
Living people
Date of birth missing (living people)